Unipeltoceras is an extinct ammonite genus included in the perisphictacian family, Aspidoceratidae, and a member of the subfamily Peltoceratinae, that lived during the Callovian stage, late in the Middle Jurassic.

Unipeltoceras is characterized by its strongly evolute, discoidal shell with sharp ribbing on the inner whorls and differing from Peltoceras, s.s. by having only an outer row of tubercles on the outer whorls.

References
Arkell, et al., 1957. Mesozoic Ammonoidea. Treatise on Invertebrate Paleontology, Part L (Ammonoidea). Geol Soc of America and Univ Kansas Press. p. L336

Jurassic ammonites
Ammonitida genera
Ammonites of Europe
Callovian life
Aspidoceratidae